Farali dry potatoes or farali potatoes is a dish in Indian cuisine. It is a dish which can be eaten during fasting ("farali" refers to fasting).

Variations
Sabudana vadas is a type of deep fried farali potato dish that is prepared with green chili peppers, potatoes and sabudanas.

Buff wada is a variant of the farali potato dish consisting of potato balls, stuffed with masala (mixed spices),  are deep-fried.

See also

 Bhajji
 Shraavana

References

Further reading

External links 
Farali Dry Potatoes - Suki Bhaji

Potato dishes
Indian cuisine